The Institute for Crop and Food Research was formed in 1992 as a New Zealand-based biological science Crown Research Institute researching new knowledge in five main areas:

 sustainable water and land use
 high performance plants
 personalised foods
 high value marine products
 biomolecules and biomaterials

It had an annual turnover of approximately $53 million (2006) and a staff of 370. Its research funding came from a mix of local and international industry and government sources, and its research spanned both fundamental and applied research.

On 6 June 2003, a Piper Navajo Chieftain on a charter flight from Palmerston North to Christchurch crashed on approach to Christchurch Airport, killing the pilot and seven Crop and Food employees, and seriously injuring two others.

On 1 December 2008, Crop & Food Research (company number 547965) merged with HortResearch to form New Zealand Institute for Plant and Food Research trading as Plant and Food Research.

References

External links
 Crop & Food web site, archived from 14 October 2008

Crown Research Institutes of New Zealand